The 1964 United States Senate election in Pennsylvania was held on November 3, 1964. Incumbent Republican U.S. Senator Hugh Scott successfully sought re-election to another term, defeating Democratic nominee Genevieve Blatt.

As of 2022, this is the last Senate election where York County voted Democratic.

Democratic primary

Candidates
Genevieve Blatt, Pennsylvania Secretary of Internal Affairs
Michael Musmanno, Justice of the Supreme Court of Pennsylvania since 1952
David B. Roberts

General election

Candidates
Genevieve Blatt, Pennsylvania Secretary of Internal Affairs (Democratic)
Morris Chertov (Socialist Workers)
Hugh Scott, incumbent U.S. Senator (Republican)
George S. Taylor (Socialist Labor)

Results

See also 
 United States Senate elections, 1964

References

Pennsylvania
1964
1964 Pennsylvania elections